Bilal Akgül (born 13 October 1982 in Adana) is a Turkish professional road cyclist and mountain biker riding for team Brisaspor. He is the first ever Turkish Olympian cyclist participating at the 2008 Summer Olympics.

He became 2005 Turkish mountain biking champion in cross-country at Ankara. The next year, he won the national champion title in marathon mountain bike race at Çanakkale and the road race. In the 2007 season, Akgül became national mountain biking champion in cross-country and in marathon. He took part at the cross-country event of 2008 Summer Olympics without having finished.

Major results
Source

2005
   1st, Kırıkkale MTB Cup, Mountainbike, Elite/U23, Kırıkkale
  2nd, Kos Cup, Mountainbike, Elite/U23, Kos
  1st, Bolu Festival MTB, Mountainbike, Elite/U23, Bolu
  1st, Kartepe XCO Cup, Mountainbike, Elite/U23, Kocaeli
  1st, National Championship, Mountainbike, XC, Elite, Ankara
  1st, Bursa MTB Cup, Mountainbike, Elite/U23, Bursa
  1st, Izmir XCO Cup, Mountainbike, Elite/U23, Izmir
  1st, Babadagi Hill Climb, Mountainbike, Elite/U23, Fethiye
  1st, Yalova Aksa XCO Cup, Mountainbike, Elite/U23, Yalova

2006
  1st, Adana MTB Cup, Mountainbike, Elite/U23, Adana
  3rd, Manavgat, Mountainbike-Marathon, Antalya
  1st, Gallipoli MTB Cup, Mountainbike, Elite/U23, Çanakkale
  2nd, Istanbul Cup, Mountainbike, Elite/U23, Istanbul
  1st, National Championship, Road, Elite 
  2nd, Konya MTB Cup, Mountainbike, Elite/U23, Konya
  3rd, Cappadocia MTB Festival, Mountainbike, Elite/U23 (a), Göreme
  2nd, Cappadocia MTB Festival, Mountainbike, Elite/U23 (c), Ürgüp
  3rd, Balkan Championship XC, Mountainbike, Kartepe, Kocaeli
  2nd, Yalova Aksa XCO Cup, Mountainbike, Elite/U23, Yalova
  1st, National Championship, Mountainbike, Marathon, Çanakkale

2007
  1st, Adana MTB Cup, Mountainbike, Elite/U23, Adana
  3rd, Büyükada Cup XCO, Mountainbike, Elite/U23, Istanbul
  1st, Gaziantep, Mountainbike, Elite/U23, Gaziantep
  1st, Polonez Adampol Cup, Mountainbike, Elite/U23, Istanbul
  1st, Ankara MTB Cup, Mountainbike, Elite/U23, Ankara
  1st, National Championship, Mountainbike, XC, Elite, Ürgüp
  3rd, Kartepe XCO Cup, Mountainbike, Elite/U23, Kocaeli
  1st, Izmir XCO Cup, Mountainbike, Elite/U23, Izmir
  2nd, Yalova Aksa XCO Cup, Mountainbike, Elite/U23, Yalova
  2nd, Babadagi Hill Climb, Mountainbike, Elite/U23, Fethiye
  1st, National Championship, Mountainbike, Marathon, Çanakkale

2008
  3rd, Stage 1 Tacettin Özsavaş Cup TTT
  35th, Olympic Games, Mountainbike, Beijing

2010
  5th, National Championship, Road, Elite, Bolu

2011
  1st, Salcano Turkish Mountainbike Championship,  Istanbul/Arnavutköy

2012
  3rd, Finike/Antalya, Mountainbike
  1st, Gaziantep, Mountainbike
  1st, Tuzla, Mountainbike 
  1st, Gaziantep, Mountainbike (b) 
  1st, National Championship, Mountainbike, XC, Elite

References

1982 births
Sportspeople from Adana
Living people
Turkish male cyclists
Turkish mountain bikers
Cross-country mountain bikers
Marathon mountain bikers
Cyclists at the 2008 Summer Olympics
Olympic cyclists of Turkey
21st-century Turkish people